Anny Lilian Johansson (born 10 March 1948 in Stockholm) is a Swedish actress. She has been engaged at the Stockholm City Theatre since 1978.

Filmography
Blå måndag (2001)
 1997 – Svensson Svensson
Beck – Mannen med ikonerna (1997)
Vinterviken (1996)
Streber (1978)
Lyckliga skitar (1970)

References

External links

Swedish stage actresses
1948 births
Living people
Swedish film actresses